Thyridanthrax is a genus of bee flies in the family Bombyliidae. There are about 12 described species in Thyridanthrax.

Species
 Thyridanthrax andrewsi (Hall, 1970)
 Thyridanthrax atratus
 Thyridanthrax fenestratoides (Coquillett, 1892)
 Thyridanthrax luminis (Hall, 1970)
 Thyridanthrax melanoptera (Hall, 1975)
 Thyridanthrax melanopterus
 Thyridanthrax meridionalis Cole, 1923
 Thyridanthrax nugator (Coquillett, 1887)
 Thyridanthrax pallidus (Coquillett, 1887)
 Thyridanthrax pertusus (Loew, 1869)
 Thyridanthrax selene (Osten Sacken, 1886)
 Thyridanthrax sini Cole, 1923

References

Further reading

External links

 

Bombyliidae